Caldas is a town and municipality in the Department of Boyacá, part of the subregion of the Western Boyacá Province in Colombia.

Municipalities of Boyacá Department